Bonas is in France.

Bonas may also refer to:

Bonäs, Sweden

Surname
Clive Bonas
Cressida Bonas

See also
Bona (disambiguation)